Roll or Rolls may refer to:

Movement about the longitudinal axis
 Roll angle (or roll rotation), one of the 3 angular degrees of freedom of any stiff body (for example a vehicle), describing motion about the longitudinal axis
 Roll (aviation), one of the aircraft principal axes of rotation of an aircraft (angle of tilt to the left or right measured from the longitudinal axis)
 Roll (ship motion), one of the ship motions' principal axes of rotation of a ship (angle of tilt to the port or starboard measured from the longitudinal axis)
 Rolling manoeuvre, a manoeuvre of any stiff body (for example a vehicle) around its roll axis:
 Roll, an aerobatic maneuver with an airplane, usually referring to an aileron roll, but sometimes instead a barrel roll, rudder roll or slow roll
 Kayak roll, a maneuver used to right a capsized kayak
 Roll program, an aerodynamic maneuver performed in a rocket launch
 Roll rate (or roll velocity), the angular speed at which an aircraft can change its roll attitude, typically expressed in degrees per second

Food
 Bread roll, a small individual loaf of bread
 Roll (food), foods such as egg roll etc.

Arts, entertainment and media 
 Roll (Anne McCue album), 2004
 Roll (Emerson Drive album), 2012
 "Roll", a song by Flo Rida from the 2008 album Mail on Sunday (album)
 Roll (Mega Man), a character in the Mega Man video game franchise
 Banjo roll, a pattern played by the banjo 
 Drum roll, a percussion technique
 Legato or rolls, a guitar technique 
 Music roll, a storage medium to operate a mechanical instrument
 Roll, a Hungarian pill bug in the 1998 animated film A Bug's Life

People

Roll
 Roll baronets, a title in the Baronetage of the United Kingdom
 Alfred Philippe Roll (1846–1919), French painter
 Bob Roll (born 1960), American professional cyclist and commentator
 Curtis Roll (1884–1970), an American judge
 Eric Roll, Baron Roll of Ipsden (1907–2005), academic economist, public servant and banker
 Ferdinand Nicolai Roll (1831–1921), Norwegian jurist and politician
 George Roll (born 1962), an American ice hockey coach
 Gernot Roll (1939–2020), a German cinematographer
 Idan Roll (born 1984), an Israeli politician
 Jacob Roll (born 1783) (1783–1870), a Norwegian judge and politician
 Jacob Roll (born 1794) (1794–1857), a Norwegian politician
 John Roll (1947–2011), a United States federal judge
 Lawson Roll (born 1965), an English cricketer
 Martin Roll (born 1967), a Danish author and management consultant
 Michael Roll (actor) (born 1961), German television actor
 Michael Roll (basketball) (born 1987), American basketball player
 Michael Roll (pianist) (born 1946), British pianist
 Richard Roll (born 1939), American economist
Roll's critique
 Sigurd Roll (1893–1944), Norwegian diplomat and athlete
 Stephan Roll (1904-1974), Romanian poet
 Sylvia Roll (born 1973), German volleyball player
 Thomas Røll (born 1977), retired Danish professional footballer
 William G. Roll (1926–2012), American psychologist and parapsychologist

de Roll
 Louis de Roll (1750-?), a Swiss soldier during the French Revolutionary and Napoleonic Wars
Roll's Regiment, a regiment of the British Army raised in 1794

Rolls
 A luxury car manufactured by Rolls-Royce Limited (1904–1973), Rolls-Royce Motors (1973–1998), or Rolls-Royce Motor Cars (1998–present)
 Charles Rolls (engraver) (1799–1885), engraver
 Charles Rolls (1877–1910), Welsh motoring and aviation pioneer, co-founder of Rolls-Royce Limited
 John Etherington Welch Rolls (1807–1870), British jurist and art collector
 John Rolls, 1st Baron Llangattock (1837–1912), British landowner and politician
 John Rolls, 2nd Baron Llangattock (1870–1916), British barrister and soldier

Places
 Roll, Arizona, U.S.
 Roll, Indiana, U.S.
 Roll, Oklahoma, U.S.
 Roll, German name for Ralsko, town in the Czech Republic

Other uses
 Roll (gymnastics), a fundamental skill in gymnastics
 Rolls (restaurant chain), in Finland
 Rolls Razor, a British safety razor and washing machine manufacturer
 Roll, a British obsolete unit of measurement for butter and cheese 
 Coin wrapper or roll, a container for a number of coins
 Scroll, or roll, a rolled-up piece of parchment or paper
 Roll (finance), process of switching to a contract with a later expiry date
 Jelly roll (options), an options trading strategy

See also

 Role (disambiguation)
 Roll call (disambiguation)
 Rolle (disambiguation)
 Roller (disambiguation)
 Rolling (disambiguation)
 Rolls-Royce (disambiguation)
 List of rolled foods
 Rock and roll, or rock 'n' roll, a genre of popular music